Edwin Price may refer to:

 Ed Price (American football) (1909–1976), American football coach
 Edwin M. Price (1884–1957), Kansas City, Missouri architect
 Edwin Price (priest) (1846–1914), British Anglican priest

See also 
 Ed Price (disambiguation)